Poush Maser Pirit (Love of Winter) is a Bengali romantic drama film directed by Nargis Akhter based on Narendranath Mitra's short story Rosh. This film was released on 2 September 2016 under the banner of Femcom Bangladesh in Bangladesh. In 1973, a Bollywood film Saudagar was made by Sudhendu Roy, based on the same story.

Plot

Cast
 Sadika Parvin Popy as Majhu Khatun
 Ahmed Rubel as Rejjak
 Tony Dias as Motaleb
 Priyanka as Fuljan
 Taru Mostafa as Wahed
 Aminur Rahman Bachchu
 Aditya Alam as Surat Ali
 Habibur Rahman Modhu as Kamar

References

External links
 

2016 films
2016 romantic drama films
Bengali-language Bangladeshi films
Bangladeshi romantic drama films
2010s Bengali-language films
Films based on short fiction
Films based on works by Narendranath Mitra
Films directed by Nargis Akhter